The Samir Shamma Prize for Islamic Numismatics is a bi-annual award for the best book or article in the field of Islamic Numismatics.

History and purpose 

The  Royal Numismatic Society established the prize in 1992 following a legacy from Honorary fellow Samir Shamma. The prize of £2000 is awarded every two years for the book or article published within the previous three years that is considered the most useful to students of Islamic numismatics.

List of winners 
Past recipients of the Samir Shamma Prize.
 1993 Gert Rispling ("The Volgar Bulgarian imitative coinage of al-amir Yaltawar ('Barman') and Mikail b. Jafar", in kenneth Jonnson (ed.): Sigtuna Papers New series 6, Stockholm, 1990)
 1995 Lutz Ilisch (Sylloge Nummorum Arabicorum Tuebingen. Palaestina IVa Bilad ash-Sham I, Tuebingen, 1993)
 1997 Hodge M. Malek (papers on Tabari dirhams) and Robert and Monika Tye (Jitals, South Uist, 1995)
 1999 Nayef G. Goussous (Umayyad Coinage of Bilad al-Sham, Amman, 1996)
 2000 Stephen Album (Sylloge of Islamic Coins in the Ashmolean Museum, 10 : Arabia and East Africa, Oxford, 1999)
 2003 Stan Goron and J. Goenka (The Coins of the Indian Sultanates, New Delhi, 2001)
 2005 Stefan Heidemann (numismatic contributions to Raqqa in S. Heidemann - A Becker (eds.): Die Islamische Stadt, Mainz, 2003) and Stephen Album and Anthony Goodwin (Sylloge of Islamic Coins in the Ashmolean Museum, 1: The Pre-Reform Coinage of the Early Islamic Period, Oxford, 2002)
 2007 Aman ur-Rahman (Zahir uddin Mahammad Babur. A Numismatic Study, Karachi, 2005) and Jere Bacharach (Islamic History Through Coins: an Analysis and Catalogue of Tenth-century Ikshidid Coinage, Cairo and New York, 2006)
 2009 Anthony Goodwin (Studies in the Khalili Collection, IV: Arab-Byzantine Coinage, London, 2005)
 2012 Giulio Bernardi (Arabic Gold Coins. Corpus, vol. I, Trieste, 2010
 2020 Dorota Malarczyk

References 

Numismatics
Awards for numismatics